Deda is a commune in Mureș County, Transylvania, Romania. It is composed of four villages: Bistra Mureşului (Dédabisztra), Deda, Filea (Füleháza) and Pietriş (Maroskövesd).

Location
The commune is situated at the feet of the Călimani Mountains, at the point where the Mureș River exits a gorge beginning at Toplița. The Casele Creek flows in the town into the Mureș. Deda is an important railway junction, linking the Târgu Mureș line with the line connecting Brașov and Dej.

History
The village of Deda was first documented in 1393, under its current name.

Population
In 2002 the commune numbered 4,332 inhabitants, including 4,001 ethnic Romanians, 68 ethnic Hungarians, 261 Roma and two people of other nationalities.

Natives
Vasile Netea, writer and historian

See also
List of Hungarian exonyms (Mureș County)

References

Communes in Mureș County
Localities in Transylvania